Class 53 may refer to:

 British Rail Class 53
 DRB Class 53, a planned, but not completed, oversize, German war locomotive (Kriegslokomotive)
 DRG Class 53, a class of German freight locomotives with a 0-6-0 wheel arrangement operated by the Deutsche Reichsbahn, with the following sub-classes:
 Class 53.0: Prussian G 4.2
 Class 53.3: Prussian G 4.3
 Class 53.6-7: Saxon V V
 Class 53.8: Württemberg Fc
 Class 53.10: Oldenburg G 4.2
 Class 53.70-71: Prussian G 3, PKP Class Th1
 Class 53.70II: BLE G 4.2
 Class 53.71II: BBÖ 47, BBÖ 49, BBÖ 58, BBÖ 56, JDŽ 124
 Class 53.72: BBÖ 59, PKP-Class Th24
 Class 53.73: EWA IIIc
 Class 53.74: ČSD Class 322.4
 Class 53.75: ČSD Class 324.3
 Class 53.76: Prussian G 4.1
 Class 53.76II:  ČSD Class 334.3
 Class 53 7607II: GWR 2301 Class
 Class 53.77: PKP Class Th3,  PKP Class Th4
 Class 53.78: EWA IIb
 Class 53.80-81: Bavarian C IV
 Class 53.82: Saxon V
 Class 53.83: Württemberg F
 Class 53.85: Baden VIIa
 Class 53.85: Baden VIIc
See also 
 DRB Class 50: The Deutsche Bundesbahn grouped 77 of these locomotives into Class 053 in 1968.